Emre Yüksektepe (born 29 September 1991) is a Turkish professional footballer who plays as a defensive midfielder for 52 Orduspor.

References

External links

1991 births
Living people
Turkish footballers
Turkey youth international footballers
Galatasaray S.K. footballers
Konyaspor footballers
Şanlıurfaspor footballers
Association football midfielders